The Making of the Mahatma  is a 1996 biographical film directed by Shyam Benegal, about the early life of Mohandas Karamchand Gandhi (also known as Mahatma Gandhi) during his 21 years in South Africa. The film is based upon the book The Apprenticeship of a Mahatma by Fatima Meer. It was an international co-production between India and South Africa.

Cast
Rajit Kapoor as Barrister Mohandas Karamchand Gandhi 
Pallavi Joshi as Kasturba Gandhi 
Paul Slabolepszy as JC Smuts 
Sean Cameron Michael as Warder
Charles Pillai
Keith Stevenson
Lieb Bester
Peter J. Elliott

Awards
1996: National Film Award for Best Actor - Rajit Kapur as Gandhi
1996: National Film Award for Best Feature Film in English

See also
List of artistic depictions of Mahatma Gandhi

External links
 
 Review from Hinduism Today

References

Films about Mahatma Gandhi
1996 films
Indian biographical films
Films based on biographies
English-language Indian films
English-language South African films
Films directed by Shyam Benegal
Films featuring a Best Actor National Award-winning performance
South African biographical films
Best English Feature Film National Film Award winners
National Film Development Corporation of India films
1990s English-language films